Lamentation was a 1587-1590 oil on canvas painting by Annibale Carracci, destroyed with other Carracci works such as Danaë at Bridgewater House in May 1941 during the London Blitz. Prints and copies of it survive, the best being those by the Ferrara painter Francesco Naselli now in Mantua's city library.

History
Its commissioner is unknown, since its first mention in the historical record dates to 1616, when it was given by a notable in Reggio Emilia to San Prospero Basilica in Reggio Emilia. Carracci had spent some time in that city during the 1580s and produced several works there, none still in their original locations, leading to the commonly-held theory that Lamentation was also produced in the city. It then passed into the Orleans Collection before going back on the market upon the French Revolution and reaching England. There it reached its final home at Bridgewater House, London residence of the Earl of Ellesmere, who had inherited the collection of which Lamentation had become a part.

Gallery

References

1590 paintings
Lost paintings
Paintings by Annibale Carracci
Paintings of the Lamentation of Christ